Robert Desmond Harman (20 June 1941 – 18 December 2007) was Dean of Christ Church Cathedral, Dublin from 2004 until 2007.

Harman was educated at Sligo Grammar School and Trinity College, Dublin. He was ordained in 1967 and his first post was as a curate in Taney Parish. After this he was successively Rector of Santry then Milltown before becoming dean.

Notes

1941 births
2007 deaths
People educated at Sligo Grammar School
Alumni of Trinity College Dublin
Deans of Christ Church Cathedral, Dublin